Sebastian "Seb" Robert Buddle is a Hong Kong professional footballer who currently plays as a forward for Hong Kong Premier League club Southern, on loan from Kitchee.

Club career
On 12 July 2016, Kitchee announced that they had signed Buddle and three others to a professional contract.

On 24 July 2018, following a preseason friendly, Hoi King confirmed that they had acquired Buddle on loan.

On 23 October 2019, Buddle scored his first professional goal against Lee Man during a Sapling Cup match.

On 15 October 2021, Buddle joined HK U23 on loan and played his first game for the club in a Sapling Cup group stage match against HKFC in which his side won 2–1.

On 21 July 2022, Buddle joined Southern on loan.

International career
After he had acquired a HKSAR passport in 2019, this meant that Buddle is eligible to represent Hong Kong in international competitions. He was named within Hong Kong U-23's squad for the 2022 AFC U-23 Asian Cup qualifiers and had made his debut against Japan U-23.

Honours

Club
Kitchee
Hong Kong Premier League: 2016–17, 2017–18, 2019–20
Hong Kong Senior Shield: 2016–17
Hong Kong FA Cup: 2016–17, 2017–18
Hong Kong Sapling Cup: 2017–18, 2019–20

Personal life
Buddle was born and raised in Discovery Bay by English parents who had moved to Hong Kong in 1994. When he was 18, he renounced his British passport in order to obtain a Hong Kong passport.

Buddle is a graduate of the West Island School.

Buddle received his Hong Kong passport in 2019 and was selected to his first U23 camp in June 2020.

He was called up for the Hong Kong U-23 side in the qualifying stage in 2021 and will travel to Japan for 2 matches in October 2021.

References

External links
 
 

Living people
Hong Kong people
Hong Kong footballers
Association football forwards
Hong Kong Premier League players
Kitchee SC players
Hoi King SA players
Southern District FC players
HK U23 Football Team players
1999 births